Olavo Redig de Campos (1906–1984) was a Brazilian architect, important in the 20th century development of the Brazilian style of Modernist architecture.

Redig de Campos was born in Rio de Janeiro, however, his father was a diplomat and he spent part of his childhood in Europe. He studied architecture at the Sapienza University of Rome, at the same time as Gregori Warchavchik and Rino Levi. In 1931 Redig de Campos returned to Brazil.

In 1946, Redig de Campos assumed the presidency of the Serviço de Conservação do Patrimônio do Itamaraty ("Heritage Conservation Service of the Foreign Ministry"), in which capacity he served for thirty years.

Works
Among the projects he designed were the:
 Embassy of Brazil in Washington, D.C., in Lima, and in Buenos Aires.
 Brazilian diplomatic residences in Beirut and Dakar.
 Civic Centre of Curitiba, Brazil
 Legislative Assembly of Paraná, Brazil
 Brazilian Military Cemetery of Pistoia
 Brazilian Monument and Tomb of the Unknown Soldier of World War II

Redig also designed residential dwellings, such as the country house of Geraldo Baptista and the urban home of the Moreira Salles family in Rio de Janeiro. The latter is today the headquarters of the Instituto Moreira Salles.

See also
 Modernist architecture in Brazil

References

Bruan, Yves. Arquitetura contemporânea no Brasil. São Paulo: Editora Perspectiva, 2002. 

Brazilian architects
Modernist architects
People from Rio de Janeiro (city)
Modernist architecture in Brazil
1906 births
1984 deaths
Sapienza University of Rome alumni
20th-century Brazilian architects